French Fab is an accreditation award created 2 October 2017 in order to federate French companies and to promote French industries throughout the world.

It is a label owned by Bpifrance.

The French government has been inspired by the French Tech created in 2013 to promote startups and French IT.

History 
The award has been created 2 October 2017 by Bruno Le Maire, Minister of Finance.

References

External links 
 La French Fab

Economy of France
Secondary sector of the economy
French awards
2017 establishments in France
Awards established in 2017